The 2020 International Court of Justice election were held on 11 and 12 November 2020 at the United Nations Headquarters in New York City. In the set of triennial elections, the General Assembly and the Security Council concurrently elect five judges to the Court for nine-year terms, in this case beginning on 6 February 2021. From the eight candidates, Yuji Iwasawa (Japan), Xue Hanqin (China), Peter Tomka (Slovakia), Julia Sebutinde (Uganda), and Georg Nolte (Germany) have been elected members of the International Court of Justice for a term of office of nine years, as both the Security Council and the General Assembly have agreed on the same candidates.

Background
The International Court of Justice (ICJ), based in The Hague, is one of the principal organs of the United Nations. The court consists of 15 judges, with five judges elected every three years. In the case of death or other vacancy, a judge is elected for the remainder of the term. Judges are required to be independent and impartial; they may not exercise any political or administrative function, and do not act as a representative of their home state. Elections of members of the Court are governed by articles 2 through 15 of the Statute of the International Court of Justice.

The five judges whose terms expired on 5 February 2021, with their nationality, were:
 Xue Hanqin (China)
 Peter Tomka (Slovakia)
 Giorgio Gaja (Italy)
 Julia Sebutinde (Uganda)
 Yuji Iwasawa (Japan).

Candidates

Qualifications
Article 2 of the Statute of the International Court of Justice provides that judges shall be elected "from among persons of high moral character, who possess the qualifications required in their respective countries for appointment to the highest judicial offices, or are jurisconsults of recognized competence in international law".

Nomination procedure
All States parties to the Statute of the ICJ have the right to propose candidates. Nominations of candidates for election to the ICJ are made by a group consisting of the members of the Permanent Court of Arbitration (PCA), designated by that State. For this purpose, members of the PCA act in "national groups" (i.e. all the PCA members from any individual state). (In the case of UN member states not represented in the PCA, the state in question may select up to four individuals to be its "national group" for the purpose of nominating candidates to the ICJ). Every such "national group" may nominate up to four candidates, not more than two of whom shall be of their own nationality. Before making these nominations, each "national group" is recommended to consult its highest court of justice, its legal faculties and schools of law, and its national academies and national sections of international academies devoted to the study of law.

2020 nominees
On 5 February 2020, the Under-Secretary-General for Legal Affairs and the United Nations Legal Counsel, on behalf of the Secretary-General, requested nominations from the national groups of States parties to the Statute of the Court to be submitted to the Secretary-General not later than 24 June 2020, in accordance with Article 5, paragraph 1, of the Statute of the Court. 

After the established deadline for nominating candidates, 24 June 2020, a national group submitted a nomination to the Secretariat. Eight candidates contested the five positions. The nominated candidates for the 2020 election were as follows:

Election

Sources:

As more than five candidates had received the absolute majority of votes required after the first round of voting by secret ballot, the General Assembly held on 12 November 2020 another round of voting until only the required number of candidates, and no more, obtained an absolute majority. The Security Council, meeting independently from but concurrently with the General Assembly, elected five judges to the International Court of Justice after a single round of voting on 11 November 2020. In the council, eight votes constitute an absolute majority, with no distinction between permanent and non-permanent members. By contrast, all 193 Member States in the Assembly are electors and accordingly, for the purpose of election, 97 votes constituted an absolute majority.

References 

International Court of Justice elections
2020 elections in the United States